Kevin John O'Neill (born 24 February 1982) is a rugby union player who plays for Waikato Rugby Union in the Air New Zealand Cup and for the All Blacks. His position is lock. He was born in Te Aroha, New Zealand.

Career

Provincial Rugby
Kevin debuted in 2003 for Canterbury in 2003 in a warm-up match against Fiji who were on the build-up to the 2003 Rugby World Cup. He played for Canterbury until 2007 after 29 caps for Canterbury he transferred to Waikato.

Super 14
Kevin debuted for the Crusaders. He played a number of games beside All Black, Chris Jack. He was drafted to the Chiefs and since then has signed with them ending his career in Christchurch. O'Neill played most games for the Chiefs in 2008.

Representative Squads

New Zealand Under 21
O'Neill played in the World Cup winning under 21s in 2003 alongside fellow All Black, Adam Thomson.

Junior All Blacks
He was a member of the 2005 Junior All Blacks.

All Black debut
After 28 minutes on the 12/7/2008 at Carisbrook, O'Neill made his debut for the All Blacks after a knock to Ali Williams caused Williams to leave the field. Although it was not enough as the All Blacks went down to the Springboks 30 - 28 after a chip and chase from Ricky Januarie resulted in a match winning try. It was the All Blacks first loss at Carisbrook to the Springboks.

External links

1982 births
Living people
Canterbury rugby union players
Chiefs (rugby union) players
Crusaders (rugby union) players
Expatriate rugby union players in Australia
Melbourne Rebels players
New Zealand expatriate rugby union players
New Zealand international rugby union players
New Zealand people of Irish descent
New Zealand rugby union players
Rugby union locks
Rugby union players from Te Aroha
Waikato rugby union players